The 2011–12 Australian Athletics Championships was the 90th edition of the national championship in outdoor track and field for Australia. It was held from 13–15 April 2012 at the Lakeside Stadium in Melbourne. It served as a selection meeting for Australia at the 2012 Summer Olympics. The 10,000 metres event took place separately at the Zatopek 10K on 10 December 2011 at the same venue.

Medal summary

Men

Women

References

External links 
 Athletics Australia website

2012
Australian Athletics Championships
Australian Championships
Athletics Championships
Sports competitions in Melbourne
2010s in Melbourne